Fiona Hunter (née Johnson, born 4 August 1970) is a former New Zealand rugby union player. She made her debut for New Zealand on 26 August at RugbyFest 1990 against the Netherlands at Ashburton. She also featured in the match against the Soviet Union, and made appearances for her club Paremata-Plimmerton.

References 

1970 births
Living people
New Zealand female rugby union players
New Zealand women's international rugby union players